Springfield Presbyterian Church is a historic Presbyterian church located at Sykesville, Carroll County, Maryland, United States. It is a -story brick structure in Flemish bond on a stone foundation. The church was built in 1836 and is a 3-story structure constructed of uncoursed rubble stone covered in stucco. It served as the area's first school as well as the building of worship for the Presbyterian congregation. The church was founded by immigrants from Scotland and the church holds cultural events to celebrate its Scottish heritage.

The Springfield Presbyterian Church was listed on the National Register of Historic Places in 1986.

References

External links
, including photo from 1985, at Maryland Historical Trust

Presbyterian churches in Maryland
Churches in Carroll County, Maryland
Churches on the National Register of Historic Places in Maryland
Churches completed in 1836
Scottish-American culture in Maryland
1836 establishments in Maryland
19th-century Presbyterian church buildings in the United States
Sykesville, Maryland
National Register of Historic Places in Carroll County, Maryland